Mouguías (Mohías in Spanish and officially Mouguías/Mohías) is one of seven parishes (administrative divisions) in the Coaña municipality, within the province and autonomous community of Asturias, in northern Spain.

The population is 989 (INE 2007).

Villages
Astás
El Espín
Foxos
Medal
Mouguías
Ortigueira
El Rabeirón
A Regueira
Os Villares
A Veiga de Pindolas

References

Parishes in Coaña